Panchanan Karmakar (Mallick) (died c. 1804) was an Indian Bengali inventor, born at Tribeni, Hooghly, Bengal Presidency, British India, hailed from Serampore. He assisted Charles Wilkins in creating the first the Bangla type.  His wooden Bengali alphabet and typeface had been used until Ishwar Chandra Vidyasagar proposed a simplified version. Apart from Bangla, Karmakar developed type in 14 languages, including Arabic, Persian, Marathi, Telugu, Burmese and Chinese.

Early life and career

Karmakar was born in Tribeni. His ancestors were calligraphers; they inscribed names and decorations on copper plates, weapons, metal pots, etc.

Andrews, a Christian missionary, had a printing press at Hughli. In order to print Nathaniel Brassey Halhed's A Grammar of the Bengal Language, he needed a Bangla type. Under the supervision of English typographer Charles Wilkins, Karmakar created the first Bengali typeface for printing.

In 1779, Karmakar moved to Kolkata to work for Wilkins' new printing press. in chuchura, Hoggly. In 1801, he developed a typeface for British missionary William Carey's Bangla translation of the New Testament. In 1803, Karmakar developed a set of Devnagari script, the first Nagari type to be developed in India.

References

1804 deaths
Indian typographers and type designers
People from Hooghly district
20th-century Indian designers
Bengali male artists
18th-century Indian inventors
19th-century Indian inventors
18th-century Indian artists
19th-century Indian artists
Artists from West Bengal